Old Court station is a Metro SubwayLink station in Lochearn, Maryland. It is the second most northern and western station on the line, with approximately 625 parking spaces.

Three buses currently serve this station:
92 to Scotts Level Road (SB/WB)/ Velvet Valley (NB) or Glen Avenue (EB)
83 to Mondawmin Metro Subway Station (SB)
37 to Patapsco Light Rail Stop (SB)

Station layout

Nighttime closure
In 1993, in order to save costs, Old Court was one of three Metro stations that closed at 8 PM. In 2001, the station once again remained open until midnight.

References

Metro SubwayLink stations
Baltimore County, Maryland landmarks
Railway stations in the United States opened in 1987
Lochearn, Maryland
1987 establishments in Maryland
Railway stations in Baltimore County, Maryland